Faith is the third studio album by American country music artist Faith Hill, released in 1998. Due to the success of the single "This Kiss" in Australia and the UK, the album was released under the title Love Will Always Win, featuring the title track, a new version of "Piece of My Heart" and two new versions of "Let Me Let Go", which replace "You Give Me Love", "My Wild Frontier", "Just to Hear You Say That You Love Me" and the original version of "Let Me Let Go". Other tracks on this album are mixed differently and remove some of the country elements and replacing them with a more pop sound. In some countries, "It Matters to Me", the title track and hit single from Hill's second album, is also included as a bonus track. "Better Days" was previously recorded by Bekka & Billy on their debut album. "Love Will Always Win" was later issued as a single by Garth Brooks and Trisha Yearwood from Brooks' album The Lost Sessions. "I Love You" was originally recorded by Celine Dion for her album, Falling into You.  The album was released on April 21, 1998 and was certified six-times Platinum by the RIAA for shipments of over six million copies in the United States.

Track listing
North American version

International version – Love Will Always Win

Personnel

David Angell - violin
Bob Bailey - background vocals
Larry Beaird - acoustic guitar
Bekka Bramlett - background vocals
Steve Brewster - drums
Mike Brignardello - bass guitar
Pat Buchanan - electric guitar
Larry Byrom - acoustic guitar
John Catchings - cello
Beth Nielsen Chapman - background vocals
Joe Chemay - bass guitar 
Lisa Cochran - background vocals
David Davidson - violin
Mark Douthit - saxophone
Glen Duncan - fiddle
Connie Ellisor - violin
Kim Fleming - background vocals
Larry Franklin - fiddle
Paul Franklin - steel guitar
Byron Gallimore - electric guitar
Sonny Garrish - steel guitar
Vince Gill - background vocals
Carl Gorodetzky - violin
Jim Grosjean - viola
Mike Haynes - trumpet
Aubrey Haynie - fiddle
Tom Hemby - mandolin, gut string guitar
Faith Hill – lead and background vocals
Dann Huff - electric guitar
Ronn Huff - conductor
John Barlow Jarvis - piano
Mike Johnson - steel guitar
Jeff King - electric guitar
Anthony LaMarchina - cello
Lee Larrison - violin
Paul Leim - drums
Bob Mason - cello
Brent Mason - electric guitar
Chris McDonald - trombone
Tim McGraw - duet vocals
Terry McMillan - percussion
Gene Miller - background vocals
Cate Myer - violin
Steve Nathan - keyboards 
Craig Nelson - bass guitar, background vocals
Michael Omartian - piano, accordion, keyboards 
Kim Parent - background vocals
Chris Rodriguez - background vocals
Pamela Sixfin - violin
Joe Spivey - fiddle
Julia Tanner - cello
Alan Umstead - violin
Catherine Umstead - violin
Gary Vanosdale - viola
Mary Kathryn Vanosdale - violin
Biff Watson - acoustic guitar
Kristin Wilkinson - viola
Lonnie Wilson - acoustic guitar, drums
Todd Wolfe - electric guitar
Glenn Worf - bass guitar 
Curtis Young - background vocals

Production
Producers: Faith Hill and Byron Gallimore (tracks 1, 2, 4-7, 10), Faith Hill and Dann Huff (tracks 3, 8, 9, 11, 12)
Associate producer: Ann Callis
Engineers: Jeff Balding, Julian King
Assistant engineers: Jeff Balding, Ricky Cobble, Mark Hagan, Richard Hanson, Joe Hayden, Chris Rowe, Aaron Swihart, Marty Williams
Mixing: Chris Lord-Alge
Mixing assistant: Mike Dy
Mastering: Doug Sax
Editing: Eric Mansfield
Assistant: Missi Callis
Production coordination: Lauren Koch
String arrangements: Ronn Huff
Art direction: Sheli Jones, Aimee McMahan, Sandra Westerman
Design: Garrett Rittenberry
Photography: Russ Harrington
Hair stylist: Earl Cox
Stylists: Lisa Fernandez, Claudia McConnell-Fowler, Jonathon Skow
Make-up: Stacey Martin

Charts

Weekly charts

Year-end charts

Certifications

References

1998 albums
Faith Hill albums
Warner Records albums
Albums produced by Dann Huff
Albums produced by Byron Gallimore